Ulsan, officially the Ulsan Metropolitan City, is South Korea's seventh-largest metropolitan city and the eighth-largest city overall, with a population of over 1.1 million inhabitants. It is located in the south-east of the country, neighboring Busan to the south and facing Gyeongju to the north.

Ulsan is the industrial powerhouse of South Korea, forming the heart of the Ulsan Industrial District. It has the world's largest automobile assembly plant, operated by the Hyundai Motor Company; the world's largest shipyard, operated by Hyundai Heavy Industries; and the world's third largest oil refinery, owned by SK Energy. In 2020, Ulsan had a GDP per capita of $65,352, the highest of any region in South Korea.

Administrative divisions
Ulsan is divided into four gu (districts) and one gun (county):
Buk District
Dong District
Jung District
Nam District
Ulju County

History
Stone tools found at the Mugeo-dong Ok-hyeon archaeological site indicate that Ulsan was inhabited by humans at least as early as the Paleolithic Era. Other findings indicate human inhabitation in the Neolithic Era. Ulsan also contains a substantial number of settlement remains from the Bronze Age. During the Jinhan confederacy, Ulsan was a site of iron mining and production. In the Later Silla period, Ulsan served as an important port for the economic hub of Gyeongju, and likely saw the import of luxury Persian goods such as silver, glass, and peacock tails.

In 1592, the future Port of Ulsan was the site of a major battle when warrior monks joined citizen soldiers in resisting Japanese invasion. On January 29, 1598, a combined military operation between Korea and China tried to besiege the castle, but failed as reinforcements from Japan came to delay the fighting. Records from the Joseon Dynasty show that Ulsan was developed as a shipbuilding site as early as 1642. 

Owing to the two World Wars, Ulsan began to grow as an industrial center. During this time it was part of Keishōnan-dō. In 1962, Ulsan was chosen to become a Special Industrial Zone and in the following year, it formally became a city. It went on to become one of the leading industrial cities of the world, similar to Detroit, Belfast, Bochum, Sheffield, Leipzig, Visakhapatnam, Dresden and Jamshedpur. The Hyundai Group and SK Group began setting up large businesses in Ulsan. Hyundai Heavy Industries established the shipyard in Ulsan and Hyundai Motor Company started there. Later on SK Energy developed an oil refinery and petrochemical hub there. Ulsan soon transformed into a modern metropolitan city.

Geography 
Ulsan is bounded on Busan.

Climate

Ulsan has a monsoon-influenced humid subtropical climate (Köppen: Cfa/Cwa), with cold but dry winters, and hot, humid summers. Its location on the Korean peninsula results in a seasonal lag. The warmest days occur in August and averaging very near . Precipitation is relatively low in the winter months, but there is high rainfall from April to September.

Demographics

Religion 
According to the 2015 census, a majority of Ulsan residents did not belong to any religion. Buddhism was the most common religion with 29.8% of residents being adherents, followed by Protestantism at 10.9% and Roman Catholicism at 4.2%.

Economy

As the centre of the Ulsan Industrial District, the city is the corporate base of the multinational Hyundai conglomerate. Up to 1962, Ulsan operated as a fishing port and market centre. As part of South Korea's first five-year economic plan, Ulsan became an open port. Additionally, the government designated Ulsan as a Special Industrial District, which encouraged development of major industrial plants and factories: an oil refinery, fertilizer plants, automobile production, and heavy industries were developed here. The shipbuilding port Bangeojin was annexed by the city in 1962.

Hyundai Group founded Hyundai Heavy Industries in Ulsan in 1973, which effectively turned the city into a company town and drew a large influx of workers into the city. The company's importance to the city can be seen in its name's omnipresence, with a highway named after Hyundai's founder, and the hospital, school, theater, as well as many restaurants and department stores bearing the Hyundai name.

Amid a global downturn in shipbuilding, Hyundai Heavy Industries sold $1 billion of assets and laid off large numbers of employees in 2016. The company borrowed money from the state-run Korea Development Bank in order to purchase Daewoo Shipbuilding & Marine Engineering, forming Korea Shipbuilding & Offshore Engineering, with plans to move corporate headquarters to Seoul. Some view this downturn as an indicator of South Korea's over-reliance on chaebols, and fear that a period of deindustrialization for Ulsan mirroring the United States' Rust Belt could be on the horizon.

The city has the world's third largest  oil refinery with 840,000 BPD, owned by SK Energy. South Korea’s no.3 S-oil refinery complex with 669,000BPD and 1.7million PX plant of world single largest facility, 39,000BPD lubricant base oil, owned by Saudi Aramco, is also in Ulsan.

Ulsan is the home of the world's largest automobile assembly plant, with an annual capacity of 1,700,000 units, operated by Hyundai Motors. The plant started with 50,000 capacity in 1968 and has expanded 30 times to become the top complex in the world with its own export piers with logistics competitiveness. Its integrated design of related functions was inspired by the Ford River Rouge Complex in Dearborn, Michigan.

In November 2011, SB LiMotive opened an advanced lithium-ion battery production plant in Ulsan. SB LiMotive was a 50-50 consortium of Samsung SDI and Robert Bosch GmbH. In September 2012, Samsung SDI bought out Robert Bosch GmbH's portion of SB LiMotive for $95 million to gain 100% ownership of the Ulsan production facility. The Ulsan plant is one of Samsung SDI's trio of advanced car-battery production facilities.

Transportation

The city transport department plans to build a light-rail line. The public transportation system is as good as any other major Korean city. The bus system shows a specific ETA at most bus stops.

Ulsan Airport, constructed in 1970 and expanded in 1997, has more than 20 flights per day to and from Seoul's Gimpo International Airport and 4 flights per week to and from Jeju International Airport. In November 2010, Korea's high-speed train network, the KTX, was extended to Ulsan. This provides a high-speed link to Seoul, with a running time of just over 2 hours. The new KTX station (Ulsan Station) is in nearby Eonyang, with a series of express buses (5001-5005), as well as some city buses serving the new station. The original city station has been renamed Taehwa River Station.

Sports

The city hosts the K League 1 football club Ulsan Hyundai FC. After the 2002 FIFA World Cup, they relocated from their former stadium in Jung-gu, which is now a municipal ground, to the Munsu Stadium, which hosted several matches during the 2002 World Cup. The club have been crowned champions of Asia twice, winning the AFC Champions League in 2012 and 2020. Ulsan was home to another football team, Ulsan Hyundai Mipo Dolphin FC, which played in the Korea National League until 2016, when it was dissolved. Currently, Ulsan is home to another football team, Ulsan Citizen FC, which plays in the K3 League.

It is also home to the University of Ulsan and its sports programs. Ulsan also hosts Korean Basketball League team Ulsan Hyundai Mobis Phoebus. Their home ground is Dongchun Gymnasium, which located in Jung-Gu.

Lotte Giants, a KBO League baseball club in Busan, plays some of their home matches at the Ulsan Munsu Baseball Stadium.

Tourist attractions 
In Yeongnam Alps, there are seven tall mountains (Gajisan, Sinbulsan, Ganwolsan, Cheonhwangsan, Yeongchuksan, Goheonsan, Jaeyaksan) over 1,000m above sea level. Sinbulsan (MT.) Ridge, where grasses turn silver in autumn, is one of the best sights to see in the Yeongnam Alps. Eoksae festival is held every early October in Ganwoljae, which is best known for its colony of silver grass. Korea's largest traditional folk Onggi (earthware) village is Oegosan. The traditional Onggi (earthware) manufacturing process is carried on here and is open to tourists, including Onggi workshops and kilns. The Ulsan Onggi museum offers a variety of information related to Onggi and displays a diversity of this earthware.

As the only whale museum in Korea, Jangsaengpo Whale Museum collects, maintains and displays whaling-related artifacts. They have become more rare since 1986, when whaling was internationally prohibited in order to protect the species. The museum provides a variety of information related to whales and marine ecosystems; it is a space for education, research and experience. Whale cruises depart from Jangsaengpo port.

"Natural, Clean and Comfortable" are the main themes, and it is a place for urbanites to seek nature. It sponsors a variety of events and festivals for families. it is a pleasant place for relaxation where you can breathe in nature during daily life. In particular, the Rose Festival every June presents a feast for the eyes and nose. Taehwagang (River) National Garden ; Simnidaesup (10-ri bamboo grove), one of the 12 scenic beauties of Ulsan, was restored; now the river and the bamboo grove are connected. This space expresses the related ecology of the area, showing the importance of nature and environment. It allows visitors the chance to observe and experience wildlife in its natural environment and to relax while being one of nature. Ulsan has beautiful beaches (Jinha, Ilsan). Daewangam Park features a lush, hundred-year-old pine forest. Ganjeolgot Cape is noted as the first place to see the sunrise from the Korean peninsula. A sunrise festival is held every New Year's Day.

Ulsan Industry Park has been leading the Pacific Rim industry in the 21st century. Ulsan has Hyundai Motor Company, with the world's largest single-purpose plant; Hyundai Heavy Industries, the biggest heavy industry leader in the world; Hyundai Mipo Shipbuilding, and Petrochemical Park, leaders in Korea's chemistry industry.

Festival 
 April : Seo Duk-chul Original Children's Song Competitions
 July ~ August : Ulsan Summer Festival
 December 31 ~ January 1 : Ganjeolgot Sunrise Festival

In media
Ulsan is one of the filming locations of the Munhwa Broadcasting Corporation 2012 South Korean television melodrama series May Queen, starring Han Ji-hye, Kim Jae-won, and Jae Hee.

Twin towns – sister cities

Notable people
 Kim Young-chul, comedian and singer
 Kim Tae-hee, actress
 Han Chae-ah, actress
 Oh Yoon-ah, actress
 Raina, singer (After School and Orange Caramel)
 Tei, singer
 Seo In-guk, singer and actor
 Yura, singer (Girl's Day)
 Jang Ki-yong, model and actor
 Kim Mingyu, actor and former Produce X 101 contestant
 Yumdda, rapper
 Lee Wan, actor
 Han So-hee, actress
 Lee So-hee, badminton player
 Kim Su-ji, diver
 Bibi, singer
 Kim Seung-gyu, football player
 Jung Woo-young, football player
 Lee Jae-sung, football player

See also
Bangudae Petroglyphs
List of cities in South Korea
List of oil refineries
List of South Korean regions by GDP

References

External links

 
Ulsan Metropolitan City official site 
Ulsan : Official Site of Korea Tourism Org
Ulsan's Foreigner Living Site

 

 
Populated coastal places in South Korea
Special Cities and Metropolitan Cities of South Korea
Port cities and towns in South Korea